The Chemistry Development Kit (CDK) is computer software, a library in the programming language Java, for chemoinformatics and bioinformatics. It is available for Windows, Linux, Unix, and macOS. It is free and open-source software distributed under the GNU Lesser General Public License (LGPL) 2.0.

History
The CDK was created by Christoph Steinbeck, Egon Willighagen and Dan Gezelter, then developers of Jmol and JChemPaint, to provide a common code base, on 27–29 September 2000 at the University of Notre Dame. The first source code release was made on 11 May 2011. Since then more than 100 people have contributed to the project, leading to a rich set of functions, as given below. Between 2004 and 2007, CDK News was the project's newsletter of which all articles are available from a public archive. Due to an unsteady rate of contributions, the newsletter was put on hold.

Later, unit testing, code quality checking, and Javadoc validation was introduced. Rajarshi Guha developed a nightly build system, named Nightly, which is still operating at Uppsala University. In 2012, the project became a support of the InChI Trust, to encourage continued development. The library uses JNI-InChI to generate International Chemical Identifiers (InChIs).
In April 2013, John Mayfield (né May) joined the ranks of release managers of the CDK, to handle the development branch.

Library
The CDK is a library, instead of a user program. However, it has been integrated into various environments to make its functions available. CDK is currently used in several applications, including the programming language R, CDK-Taverna (a Taverna workbench plugin), Bioclipse, PaDEL, and Cinfony. Also, CDK extensions exist for Konstanz Information Miner (KNIME) and for Excel, called LICSS.

In 2008, bits of GPL-licensed code were removed from the library. While those code bits were independent from the main CDK library, and no copylefting was involved, to reduce confusions among users, the ChemoJava project was instantiated.

Major features

Chemoinformatics
 2D molecule editor and generator
 3D geometry generation
 ring finding
 substructure search using exact structures and Smiles arbitrary target specification (SMARTS) like query language
 QSAR descriptor calculation
 fingerprint calculation, including the ECFP and FCFP fingerprints
 force field calculations
 many input-output chemical file formats, including simplified molecular-input line-entry system (SMILES), Chemical Markup Language (CML), and chemical table file (MDL)
 structure generators
 International Chemical Identifier support, via JNI-InChI

Bioinformatics
 protein active site detection
 cognate ligand detection
 metabolite identification
 pathway databases
 2D and 3D protein descriptors

General
 Python wrapper; see Cinfony
 Ruby wrapper
 active user community

See also

 Bioclipse – an Eclipse–RCP based chemo-bioinformatics workbench
 Blue Obelisk
 JChemPaint – Java 2D molecule editor, applet and application
 Jmol – Java 3D renderer, applet and application
 JOELib – Java version of Open Babel, OELib
List of free and open-source software packages
 List of software for molecular mechanics modeling

References

External links
 
 CDK Wiki – the community wiki
 Planet CDK - a blog planet
 CDK Google+ page
 OpenScience.org

Bioinformatics software
Chemistry software for Linux
Computational chemistry software
Free chemistry software
Free software programmed in Java (programming language)